Harpagodes is an extinct genus of fossil sea snails, marine gastropod mollusks in the family Harpagodidae.

Selected species
These are some of the species within the genus Harpagodes.
 Harpagodes americanus †
 Harpagodes aranea (d'Orbigny, 1850)
 Harpagodes beaumontiana (d'Orbigny, 1843) †
 Harpagodes desori (Pictet & Campiche, 1864) †
 Harpagodes ignobilis (Morris & Lycett, 1851) †
 Harpagodes incertus †
 Harpagodes japonicus †
 Harpagodes matheroni †
 Harpagodes mexicanus †
 Harpagodes nodosus (J. de C. Sowerby, 1823) †
 Harpagodes oceani †
 Harpagodes pelagi (Brongniart, 1821) †
 Harpagodes ribeiroi Choffat, 1886 †
 Harpagodes rupellentis †
 Harpagodes sachalinensis Yabe & Nago, 1925 †
 Harpagodes shumardi (Hill) †
 Harpagodes thirriae (Contejean) †
 Harpagodes valcuii †
 Harpagodes wrightii (Morris & Lycett, 1851) †

Description
"Shell obconic or ovate-conoid, with the spire moderately elevated, the canal produced into a long boldly recurved towards the left, and the labrum (...) spiniform digitations. Whorls convex or flat between the angle and the suture, spirally ribbed, with larger rib-like angular, median, and anterior fascioles (and sometimes post-angular), each emitting long spiniform digitations; and with a sutural canaliculate digitation accumbent on the spire, continued and recurved backwards." (Original description of Harpagodes by Gill, 1870).

Distribution
Fossils of these snails have been found in the Cretaceous rocks of Austria, Egypt, France, Mexico, Trinidad and Tobago, Yemen and in the Jurassic rocks of Argentina, Ethiopia, Israel, Kenya, Lebanon, Mexico, Portugal, Saudi Arabia, Tanzania and Tunisia.

References

GBIF

Jurassic gastropods
Cretaceous gastropods
Pliensbachian genus first appearances
Toarcian genera
Aalenian genera
Bajocian genera
Bathonian genera
Callovian genera
Oxfordian genera
Kimmeridgian genera
Tithonian genera
Berriasian genera
Valanginian genera
Hauterivian genera
Barremian genera
Aptian genera
Albian genera
Cenomanian genus extinctions
Jurassic animals of Europe
Jurassic animals of North America
Jurassic animals of Africa
Fossil taxa described in 1870